The Bayer designation Rho Sagittarii (Rho Sgr, ρ Sagittarii, ρ Sgr) is shared by two stars in the constellation Sagittarius.

 ρ1 Sagittarii
 ρ2 Sagittarii

The two stars are separated by 0.46° in the sky. Because they are close to the ecliptic, they can be occulted by the Moon and, very rarely, by planets. The next occultation of ρ¹ Sagittarii by a planet will take place on 23 February 2046, when it will be occulted by Venus.

References

Sagittarii, Rho
Sagittarius (constellation)
Double stars
Sagittarii, 44/5